Stitches is a Canadian retailer and a division of Young Manufacturer Inc. The first Stitches store was founded in Toronto in 1975 along with Young Manufacturer Inc., now YM Inc by entrepreneur Michael Gold (ne Goldgrub)

History
1975 Opening of the first Stitches store
1987 Introduction of a private label collection
1998 National retailer status with a presence in all Canadian provinces
2007 Introduction of the New Concept store. Since then most of its stores have been renovated.

Locations 
As of February 2021, there are 57 Stitches stores in Canada.

References

1975 establishments in Ontario
Clothing brands of Canada
Companies based in Toronto
Retail companies established in 1975
Clothing retailers of Canada